Last of the Summer Wine's 30th series originally aired 19 April 2009. All eleven episodes in series 30 were 30 minutes in length. A New Years Special aired on 31 December 2008. All of the episodes were written by Roy Clarke and directed by Alan J. W. Bell.

This series is notable for forming a new trio composed of Alvin, Entwistle and Hobbo, who was introduced in the New Years Special.
Clegg (Peter Sallis) and Truly (Frank Thornton) are now demoted to secondary characters, filmed only in studio scenes due to the cost of insurance for the actors at their age on location.

Outline
The trio in this series consisted of:

First appearances
Hobbo Hobdyke (2008–2010)
Stella (2008–2010)

Episode Information

New Year Special (2008)

Regular series

Reception

Viewers
This series started on 19 April 2009.

Critics
This comedy show is criticised for its speculated loss of quality and the fact that it is generally aimed at the older generation. Despite this, the show still gains respectable viewing figures.

DVD release
The box set for series thirty was released by Universal Playback in August 2016, mislabelled as a box set for series 31 & 32.

References

See also

Last of the Summer Wine series
2008 British television seasons
2009 British television seasons